The ashy tit (Melaniparus cinerascens) is a species of bird in the family Paridae. It is found in Angola, Botswana, Namibia, South Africa, and Zimbabwe. Its natural habitats are subtropical or tropical dry forests and dry savanna.

The ashy tit was formerly one of the many species in the genus Parus but was moved to Melaniparus after a molecular phylogenetic analysis published in 2013 showed that the members of the new genus formed a distinct clade.

References

External links
 Ashy tit - Species text in The Atlas of Southern African Birds.

ashy tit
Birds of Southern Africa
ashy tit
Taxa named by Louis Jean Pierre Vieillot
Taxonomy articles created by Polbot